The President of the Council of Ministers (sometimes titled Chairman of the Council of Ministers) is the most senior member of the cabinet in the executive branch of government in some countries. Some Presidents of the Council of Ministers are the heads of government, and thus are informally referred to as a Prime Minister or Premier.

Countries currently using the title
  Chairman of the Council of Ministers of Bosnia and Herzegovina
  President of the Council of Ministers of Italy
  President of the Council of Ministers of Peru
  President of the Council of Ministers of Poland

In Supranational organisation
  Chairman of the Council of Ministers of the Union State of Russia and Belarus

Countries that previously used the title
  President of the Council of Ministers (Empire of Brazil) (1847–1889)
  President of the Council of Ministers (United States of Brazil) (1961–1963)
  Chairmen of the Council of Ministers (Bulgaria) (1879–1991)
  President of the Council of Ministers of Cambodia (1947–1970)
  Chairman of the Council of Ministers of the German Democratic Republic (1949–1990)
   President of the Council of Ministers (France) (Bourbon Restoration, July Monarchy, 2nd, 3rd and 4th Republic)
  Chairman of the Council of Ministers of the Hungarian People's Republic (1949–1989)
  President of the Council of Ministers (Kingdom of Portugal) (1834–1910)
  President of the Council of Ministers (Portuguese Republic) (1932–1974)
  President of the Council of Ministers (Romania) (1862-1989)
  President of the Council of Ministers (Spain) (1834–1939)
  Chairman of the Council of Ministers of the Soviet Union (1922–1991)
  Chairman of the Council of Ministers (Vietnam) (1980–1992)
  President of the Council of Ministers (Kingdom of Yugoslavia) (1918–1941)
  President of the Council of Ministers of Cuba (1976–2019)

See also
Council of Ministers

References

Government occupations

da:Regeringschef#Konseilspræsident